The 2011 Toyota Premier Cup featured Thai Port, the winners of the 2010 Thai League Cup against Shonan Bellmare from the 2010 J. League Division 1.

Final

2011
2011 in Thai football cups
2011 in Japanese football
2011